Across the Concrete Sky is the 16th studio album by British/Australian soft rock duo Air Supply released in 2003. The single "Goodnight" got minor recognition. To date, this is the only studio album of them that is not available in any music streaming services.

Track listing
All songs written by Graham Russell; except "A Place Where We Belong" co-written by Alejandro Lerner.
"Shadow of the Sun" – 5:42  
"Big Cat" – 4:43  
"Love Is the Arrow" – 3:34  
"We Are All Children" – 4:49  
"A Place Where We Belong" – 4:57  
"Feel Like Screaming" – 4:43  
"I'll Find You" – 4:12  
"Come to Me" – 5:31  
"I Want You" – 4:50  
"You Belong to Me" – 3:56  
"Goodnight" – 2:36

Personnel 

Air Supply
 Russell Hitchcock – vocals
 Graham Russell – vocals, acoustic guitar, electric guitar, acoustic piano, keyboards

Additional musicians
 Jed Moss – acoustic piano, backing vocals
 Alejandro Lerner – acoustic piano (5)
 Jonni Lightfoot – guitars, electric bass, electric upright bass, drums
 Mark T. Williams – drums
 Louis Clark – string arrangements
 John Philip Shenale – string arrangements
 Stina – backing vocals

Production 
 Graham Russell – producer, concept, mixing 
 Jonni Lightfoot – engineer, mixing, digital editing 
 Eddy Schreyer – mastering 
 Jay Anderson – production coordinator
 Jed Moss – production coordinator 
 Jody Russell – project coordinator, design, photography
 Barry Siegel – management

References

2003 albums
Air Supply albums
Albums produced by Graham Russell